Alfred Stöger (1900–1962) was an Austrian film director and producer.

Selected filmography

Producer
 Knall and Fall as Imposters (1952)
 Sarajevo (1955)
 The Schimeck Family (1957)
 The Forests Sing Forever (1959)
 The Inheritance of Bjorndal (1960)
 Kauf dir einen bunten Luftballon (1961)
 Three Men in a Boat (1961)

Director
 Another World (1937)
 Mistake of the Heart (1939)
 Goetz von Berlichingen (1955)

References

Bibliography
 Goble, Alan. The Complete Index to Literary Sources in Film. Walter de Gruyter, 1999.

External links

1900 births
1962 deaths
Austrian film producers
Austrian film directors